These are the official results of the Men's High Jump event at the 1994 European Championships in Helsinki, Finland, held at Helsinki Olympic Stadium on 7 and 9 August 1994.

Medalists

Results

Qualification
Qualification: 2.28 m (Q) or best 12 performances (q)

Final

Participation
According to an unofficial count, 26 athletes from 17 countries participated in the event.

 (1)
 (1)
 (1)
 (3)
 (3)
 (2)
 (1)
 (1)
 (1)
 (1)
 (1)
 (2)
 (3)
 (1)
 (1)
 (1)
 (2)

See also
 1988 Men's Olympic High Jump (Seoul)
 1990 Men's European Championships High Jump (Split)
 1991 Men's World Championships High Jump (Tokyo)
 1992 Men's Olympic High Jump (Barcelona)
 1993 Men's World Championships High Jump (Stuttgart)
 1995 Men's World Championships High Jump (Gothenburg)
 1996 Men's Olympic High Jump (Atlanta)
 1997 Men's World Championships High Jump (Athens)
 1998 Men's European Championships High Jump (Budapest)

References

 Results

High jump
High jump at the European Athletics Championships